Malva tournefortiana is a species of flowering plant in the family Malvaceae, native to Morocco, Portugal, Spain and France. A hexaploid, it is in section Bismalva with M.moschata and M.alcea.

References

tournefortiana
Flora of France
Flora of Morocco
Flora of Portugal
Flora of Spain
Plants described in 1755 
Taxa named by Carl Linnaeus